Neem Neem Shahad Shahad is an Indian Hindi language drama series, which premiered on 15 August 2011 on Sahara One. The series is produced by Dheeraj Kumar of Creative Eye Limited, and stars Amrapali Gupta & Anas Khan as lead actors. The series was followed by its second season with new name, Tujh Sang Preet Lagai Sajna, due to change its genre, which also aired on Sahara One.

Plot
Neem Neem Shahad Shahad is the story  of two sisters, Sonali and Nirali. They marry cousins and start living in the same house. Both sisters have diametrically opposed views on family life. While the traditional Sonali favours the joint family system, the modern Nirali wants a nuclear family. The conflicts caused by this and other factors lead to many changes in the lives of the sisters.

Cast
 Amrapali Gupta as Sonali
 Khyati Mangla as Nirali 
 Shakti Anand as Chirag
 Anas Khan as Deven
 Neena Cheema as Baa
 Surendra Pal as Hansmukh
 Vidya Sinha as Ranjan, Hansmukh's wife
 Deepak Parashar as Chiman
 Anita Kulkarni as Kokila 
 Farida Dadi as Maasi ji
 Falguni Desai / Sanjivni Saathe as Usha, Narrottam 's wife 
 Hitesh Dave as Bharat 
 Vibhuti Trivedi as Kinjal,Hemal 's wife
 Mohit Dagga as Hemal
 Amit Dua as Vikram ,Sonali 's Boyfriend and Kinjal 's Brother
 Vijay Badlani as Naren Kumar

References 

Indian drama television series
Sahara One original programming
2011 Indian television series debuts
2012 Indian television series endings